John Archibald (born 17 May 1958) is an Antiguan cricketer. He played in four first-class matches for the Leeward Islands from 1977 to 1981.

See also
 List of Leeward Islands first-class cricketers

References

External links
 

1958 births
Living people
Antigua and Barbuda cricketers
Leeward Islands cricketers